John C. Monteith (1853 – 1940) was a politician from the Canadian province of Ontario. He was mayor of Stratford in 1893 and 1894.

He was born in Stratford, the son of Andrew Monteith. Monteith served as reeve, city councillor and mayor for Stratford. He was elected to represent Perth North in the Legislative Assembly of Ontario in 1902 but his election was overturned later that year after an appeal.

External links 

History of the County of Perth from 1825 to 1902, W. Johnston (1903)

1853 births
1940 deaths
Canadian people of Ulster-Scottish descent
Progressive Conservative Party of Ontario MPPs
Mayors of Stratford, Ontario